Alfred Gregory Yewen (16 May 1867 – 11 June 1923) was an Australian agricultural writer, journalist and socialist. Yewen was born in Croydon, Surrey, England and died in Newport, New South Wales.

See also

 William Lane
 William Henry Thomas McNamara
 Henry George
 Gresley Lukin
 William Morris Hughes
 William Arthur Holman
 Francis Mephan Gellatly
 Sir Henry Parkes

References

Australian journalists
Australian socialists
Australian people of English descent
1867 births
1923 deaths
People from the London Borough of Croydon